Wilfried Yeguete (born October 16, 1991) is a French professional basketball player for Limoges CSP of the LNB Pro A.

Collegiate career 
Yeguete accepted an athletic scholarship to attend the University of Florida in Gainesville, Florida. He played for coach Billy Donovan's Florida Gators men's basketball team from 2010 to 2014.  As a Gator, Yeguette was a member of an NCAA Final Four team in 2014, and NCAA Elite Eight teams in 2011, 2012 and 2013.

International career 
Yeguete represented France at the 2011 FIBA Europe Under-20 Championship in Bilbao, Spain, helping them win the bronze medal. He played for the same country at the 2015 Summer Universiade, after which France placed fifth. The power forward did not compete with the Central African Republic in the AfroBasket 2015, though.

References

External links 
Will Yeguete at RealGM
Will Yeguete at Eurobasket.com
FIBA.com profile
Florida Gators bio

1991 births
Living people
AS Monaco Basket players
Black French sportspeople
Élan Béarnais players
Florida Gators men's basketball players
French expatriate basketball people in the United States
French men's basketball players
French sportspeople of Central African Republic descent
Le Mans Sarthe Basket players
Limoges CSP players
Power forwards (basketball)
Sportspeople from Bordeaux
STB Le Havre players